Army Moves is a scrolling shooter game developed by Dinamic Software for the Amiga, Amstrad CPC, Atari ST, Commodore 64, MSX and ZX Spectrum. It is the first chapter of the Moves Trilogy and it was followed by Navy Moves in 1987 and Arctic Moves in 1995. It was first released in 1986 and published by Dinamic in Spain and by Imagine Software. Dinamic Software also developed a MS-DOS version of the game, published in 1989 in Spain.

Gameplay
The game contains seven levels that are divided into two main sections. The first four levels make up the first section, where the player has to drive an army unit (jeep or helicopter) through a terrain, steering clear of hostile vehicles.

In the last three levels that comprise the second main section, one plays as a soldier who shoots enemies along his way. In level 5 the soldier must jump from rock to rock in a river, shooting hostile birds. Thereafter, the soldier makes his way into the enemy headquarters with the goal of retrieving secret documents.

Army Moves was regarded as a rather bad game on the Amiga — "Almost non-existent gameplay makes this very poor value for money", according to a review in Zzap!. However, it received mixed reviews from ZX Spectrum magazines and was successful enough in Spain to spawn two follow-ups, Navy Moves in 1988 and Arctic Moves in 1995. The latter appeared only for the PC platform, and it included the first two chapters of the series, playable through a ZX Spectrum emulator, as an extra. A fourth entry in the series, Desert Moves was announced at the end of the game Arctic Moves, but never appeared.

The game music in non-Spanish versions is based on the Colonel Bogey March.

References

External links

Game card in Amstrad ESP.
Game card in Computer Emuzone.
Review of Army Moves in Zzap!
Review of Army Moves in Your Sinclair

Amiga games
Amstrad CPC games
Atari ST games
Commodore 64 games
Dinamic Software games
DOS games
Europe-exclusive video games
Helicopter video games
MSX games
ZX Spectrum games
1986 video games
Horizontally scrolling shooters
Video games developed in Spain
Video games scored by David Whittaker
Video games scored by Fred Gray
Single-player video games